Büchel Air Base is a military air base of the Luftwaffe in Büchel (Germany), near the city of Cochem and at about 70 km from Spangdahlem Air Base. It is home to the Taktisches Luftwaffengeschwader 33 (Tactical Air Force Wing 33; abbreviated as: TaktLwG 33) (formerly Jagdbombergeschwader 33 or Fighter Bomber Wing 33) of the German Air Force (Luftwaffe) and the 702 Munitions Support Squadron (702 MUNSS) of the United States Air Force (USAF). It was formerly the home of the 7501 MUNSS.

The TaktLwG 33 has been operating German Panavia Tornado airplanes since 1985, which are capable of delivering the twenty B61 nuclear bombs, which are stored and maintained by the 702 MUNSS of the USAF. Under the NATO nuclear sharing arrangement, these twenty B61 bombs require a dual key system, with the simultaneous authorizations of Germany and the United States, before any action is taken. The air base has been the only location in Germany with nuclear weapons since 2007.

According to the press, Eastern European member states of NATO have resisted the withdrawal of the shared nuclear bombs from Europe, fearing it would show a weakening of the U.S. commitment to defend Europe against Russia.

See also
Nuclear sharing

References

External links

 Luftwaffe.de – Standort Cochem / Büchel (German only)

Bases of the German Air Force
Cochem-Zell
Airports in Rhineland-Palatinate